DigitalGlobe is an American commercial vendor of space imagery and geospatial content, and operator of civilian remote sensing spacecraft. The company went public on the New York Stock Exchange on 14 May 2009, selling 14.7 million shares at US$19.00 each to raise US$279 million in capital. On 5 October 2017, Maxar Technologies completed its acquisition of DigitalGlobe.

The company's "WorldView" satellites should not be confused with the unrelated WorldView company (a stratospheric balloon operator).

Origins 
WorldView Imaging Corporation was founded in January 1992 in Oakland, California in anticipation of the 1992 Land Remote Sensing Policy Act (enacted in October 1992) which permitted private companies to enter the satellite imaging business. Its founder was Dr Walter Scott, who was joined by co-founder and CEO Doug Gerull in late 1992. In 1993, the company received the first high resolution commercial remote sensing satellite license issued under the 1992 Act. The company was initially funded with private financing from Silicon Valley sources and interested corporations in North America, Europe and Japan. Dr. Scott was head of the Lawrence Livermore Laboratories "Brilliant Pebbles" and "Brilliant Eyes" projects which were part of the Strategic Defense Initiative. Doug Gerull was the executive in charge of the Mapping Sciences division at the Intergraph Corporation. The company's first remote sensing license from the United States Department of Commerce allowed it to build a commercial remote sensing satellite capable of collecting images with  resolution.

In 1995, the company became EarthWatch Incorporated, merging WorldView with Ball Aerospace & Technologies Corp.'s commercial remote sensing operations.

In September 2001, EarthWatch became DigitalGlobe.

In 2007, DigitalGlobe acquired online imagery provider GlobeXplorer to extend its imagery distribution capabilities via online APIs and web services.

In 2011, DigitalGlobe was inducted into the Space Foundation's Space Technology Hall of Fame for its role in advancing commercial Earth-imaging satellites.

In 2013, DigitalGlobe purchased GeoEye.

In February 2017, MacDonald, Dettwiler and Associates (MDA) and DigitalGlobe reached an agreement for MDA to acquire DigitalGlobe for US$2.4 billion. As of May 2017, DigitalGlobe's image catalog contains 100 petabytes worth of data, and grows by 100 terabytes each day. As of 5 October 2017, MDA has announced it has completed its acquisition of DigitalGlobe. On 5 October 2017, DigitalGlobe and MDA Holdings Company merged to become Maxar Technologies

On 30 December 2019, the company announced that it had entered into a definitive agreement to sell MDA to a consortium of financial sponsors led by Northern Private Capital for CAD$1 billion (US$765 million). The sale included all of MDA's Canadian businesses, encompassing ground stations, radar satellite products, robotics, defense, and satellite components, representing approximately 1,900 employees.

On 8 April 2020, the sale of the MDA assets to NPC officially closed. The newly formed privately held Canadian company was named MDA.

Satellites

EarlyBird-1 
EarlyBird-1 (COSPAR 1997-085A) commercial Earth imaging satellite was built for EarthWatch Inc. by CTA Space Systems (later part of Orbital Sciences Corporation) and launched on 24 December 1997, from the Svobodny Cosmodrome by a Start-1 launch vehicle. It included a panchromatic (black-and-white) camera with a  resolution and a multispectral (color) camera with a  resolution. The imaging sensor was derived from a 1998-cancelled NASA satellite called Clark (SSTI 2). EarlyBird-1 was the first commercial satellite to be launched from the Svobodny Cosmodrome. Although the launch was successful, the satellite lost communications after only four days in orbit due to power system failure.

IKONOS 

IKONOS was launched 24 September 1999. It was the world's first high-resolution commercial imaging satellite to collect panchromatic (black-and-white) images with  resolution and multispectral (color) imagery with  resolution. On 31 March 2015, IKONOS was officially decommissioned after more than doubling her mission design life, spending 5,680 days in orbit and making 83,131 trips around the Earth.

QuickBird 

QuickBird, launched on 18 October 2001, was DigitalGlobe's primary satellite until early 2015. It was built by Ball Aerospace, and launched by a Boeing Delta II. It is in a  altitude, 98° inclination Sun-synchronous orbit. An earlier launch attempt resulted in the loss of QuickBird-1; after this, the second satellite of the series, QuickBird-2 was launched and it is this satellite that became known simply as QuickBird (as no other QuickBird satellites were launched). It included a panchromatic camera with a  resolution and a multispectral camera with a  resolution. On 27 January 2015, QuickBird was de-orbited, exceeding her initial life expectancy by nearly 300%.

GeoEye-1 

The GeoEye-1 satellite collects images at  panchromatic (black-and-white) and  multispectral resolution. This is used for large-scale mapping projects. GeoEye-1 can revisit any point on Earth once every three days or sooner.

WorldView satellite system

WorldView-1 

Ball Aerospace built WorldView-1. It was launched on 18 September 2007 from Vandenberg Air Force Base on a Delta II 7920-10C. Launch services were provided by United Launch Alliance (ULA). The National Geospatial-Intelligence Agency (NGIA) is expected to be a major customer of WorldView-1 imagery. It included a panchromatic only camera with a  maximum resolution.

WorldView-2 

Ball Aerospace built WorldView-2. It was launched on 8 October 2009. DigitalGlobe partnered with Boeing commercial launch services to deliver WorldView-2 into a Sun-synchronous orbit. The satellite includes a panchromatic sensor with a  maximum resolution and a multispectral sensor of

WorldView-3 

Ball Aerospace built WorldView-3. It was launched on 13 August 2014.

However, DigitalGlobe obtained permission, in June 2014, from the United States Department of Commerce, to allow the company to more widely exploit its commercial satellite imagery. The company was permitted to offer customers the highest resolution imagery available from their constellation. Additionally, the updated approvals allowed the sale of imagery to customers at up to  panchromatic and  multispectral ground sample distance (GSD), beginning six months after WorldView-3 became operational. WorldView-3 was launched aboard a United Launch Alliance Atlas V launch vehicle in the 401 configuration on 13 August 2014, at 18:30 UTC from Vandenberg Space Launch Complex 3 (SLC-3E) at Vandenberg Air Force base.

WorldView-3 is the industry's first multi-payload, super-spectral, high-resolution commercial satellite.

WorldView-4 

Originally named GeoEye-2, the spacecraft was designed and built by Lockheed Martin, while the camera payload was provided by ITT Corporation.

Following the merger of GeoEye and DigitalGlobe, in 2013, DigitalGlobe announced that GeoEye-2 would be completed as a ground spare to be launched if or when required. It was renamed to WorldView-4 in July 2014, when the company announced that it would be launched in Fall 2016. It was launched on 11 November 2016.

In January 2019, the company reported the failure of a control moment gyroscope on the satellite, rendering it inoperable.

WorldView Legion 
Currently being built by Maxar Technologies, WorldView Legion is Maxar's next generation of Earth observation satellites. WorldView Legion comprises six satellites planned to launch in 2023 into a mix of Sun-synchronous and mid-latitude orbits. These satellites will replace imaging capability currently provided by Maxar's WorldView-1, WorldView-2 and GeoEye-1 Earth observation satellites.

The six WorldView Legion satellites are contracted to launch on three flight-proven SpaceX Falcon 9 launch vehicles.

Customers and competitors 
DigitalGlobe's customers range from urban planners, to conservation organizations like the Amazon Conservation Team, to the U.S. federal agencies, including NASA and the United States Department of Defense's National Geospatial-Intelligence Agency (NGA). Much of Google Earth and Google Maps high resolution-imagery is provided by DigitalGlobe. 

DigitalGlobe's main competitor is Airbus with Spot and Pleiades satellites.

See also 

 Photogrammetry
 Remote sensing
 Satellite Sentinel Project
 Tomnod, a DigitalGlobe project that uses crowdsourcing to identify objects and places in satellite images.

References

External links 
 

Companies formerly listed on the New York Stock Exchange
Companies based in Boulder County, Colorado
Technology companies established in 1992
1992 establishments in California
2009 initial public offerings
2017 mergers and acquisitions
Westminster, Colorado
Companies based in Jefferson County, Colorado
Remote sensing companies